Agilulf, also called Aigulf (c. 537 – 601), was a Bishop of Metz between 590 or 591 and 601, and was the predecessor of Arnual or Arnoldus or Arnoald (601–609 or 611). He was a son of Ferreolus, Senator of Narbonne, and wife Dode, Abbess of Saint Pierre de Reims.

References and citations

Christian Settipani, Les Ancêtres de Charlemagne (France: Éditions Christian, 1989).
Christian Settipani, Continuite Gentilice et Continuite Familiale Dans Les Familles Senatoriales Romaines A L'epoque Imperiale, Mythe et Realite, Addenda I - III (juillet 2000- octobre 2002) (n.p.: Prosopographica et Genealogica, 2002).

537 births
601 deaths
Bishops of Metz
6th-century Frankish bishops